, known also by the blend word Housamo (放サモ, derived from Tōkyō Hōkago Samonāzu), is an F2P role-playing video game for Android and iOS. It is noted as one of the first commercially produced LGBT video games created in Japan, and one of the first commercially produced LGBT games to extensively utilize gay manga ("bara") artwork.

Gameplay
Tokyo Afterschool Summoners is a free-to-play card-based role-playing video game with turn-based battles. Each character card has a weapon type, as well as an elemental attribute that determines its strengths and weaknesses against other cards in rock–paper–scissors-style match-ups. Cards gain levels and abilities by accruing experience through battles; once a card reaches its level cap, special items must be used to uncap the card so it can gain more experience. The game utilizes an affinity system wherein buffs are applied when the cards of characters who have a relationship ("love", "like", "dislike", and "rival") are used in battle together. Cards are obtained through quests, or through the game's gacha system.

Development

The game was released on the App Store for iOS on December 2, 2016, and on Google Play for Android on December 15, 2016. Partial support for the game in English, Traditional Chinese, and Simplified Chinese was added in March 2018.

Several prominent gay manga artists, including RybiOK, GomTang, and naop, have designed characters for the game, making Tokyo Afterschool Summoners one of the first ever commercially produced video games to feature gay manga artwork.

Plot
The protagonist awakens in a version of Tokyo where "transients" – supernatural beings from fantasy and mythology – live among humans. In this world, both humans and transients utilize mysterious artifacts to fight in duels; duelists organize into guilds, which fight for control of the 23 special wards of Tokyo. The player controls the protagonist as they form a guild of their own, gather companions, and attempt to uncover how they have arrived in this world.

Characters

Main characters
 Hero
 Voiced by: Kappei Yamaguchi / Naoko Matsui / Toshiyuki Hosaka / Fuji Aki / Toshimitsu Oda
 The protagonist of the game. Their name, appearance, voice, and gender identity are chosen by the player and can be changed at any time.

 

 A satyr who serves as the hero's familiar. Explains the mechanics of the game.

 

 The protagonist's class representative. Childhood friends with Kengo.

 

 The protagonist and Shiro's classmate. Has a laid-back and jovial personality.

 

 A childhood friend to Shiro, though their friendship has fractured due to Kengo's truancy.

 

 An apprentice kannushi and demon hunter.

Secondary characters
Tokyo Afterschool Summoners features an extensive supporting cast of over one hundred unlockable characters. A partial list of supporting characters who figure heavily into the game's plot, or who are voiced by notable seiyu, are listed below.

 

 A giant transient and treasure hunter.

 

 An anthropomorphic water buffalo transient and whaler.

 

 An anthropomorphic lion transient and oil wrestler who is the guardian of the Aoyama guild.

 

 An anthropomorphic goat transient and member of the Aoyma guild.

 

 A transient high school girl and biwa player.

 

 A member of the cooking club at the protagonist's school who wields the Apicius as his artifact.

 

 A kitsune transient who owns a casino in Tokyo.

 

 An anthropomorphic Hokkaido wolf transient  and member of the Ikebukuro Berserkers.

 

 A boy genius and ninja who is a classmate to the hero.

 

 A transient and executive of the Roppongi Tycoons crime syndicate.

 

 A nun who serves as the acting master of the Aoyama guild.

 

 An anthropomorphic dog transient and classmate to the hero.

 

 An anthropomorphic hyena transient  and DJ.

 

 A transient dragon and executive of the Roppongi Tycoons.

 

 A giant demon transient and member of the Ōtemachi Genociders.

 

 An anthropomorphic shark transient and surfer.

 

 A transient and member of the Aoyma guild who specializes in torture.

References

External links
 Official website

2016 video games
Digital collectible card games
Fantasy video games
Role-playing video games
Japanese role-playing video games
Gacha games
IOS games
Android (operating system) games
Video games developed in Japan
LGBT-related video games
Video games featuring protagonists of selectable gender
Furry role-playing games